Richard Joseph Neutra (April 8, 1892 – April 16, 1970) was an Austrian-American architect. Living and building for the majority of his career in Southern California, he came to be considered a prominent and important modernist architect. His most notable works include the Kaufmann Desert House in Palm Springs, California.

Biography
Neutra was born in Leopoldstadt, the second district of Vienna, Austria Hungary, on April 8, 1892, into a wealthy Jewish family. His Jewish-Hungarian father Samuel Neutra (1844–1920) was a proprietor of a metal foundry, and his mother, Elizabeth "Betty" Glaser Neutra (1851–1905) was a member of the IKG Wien. Richard had two brothers who also emigrated to the United States, and a sister, Josephine Theresia "Pepi" Weixlgärtner, an artist who was married to the Austrian art historian Arpad Weixlgärtner and who emigrated later to Sweden, where her work can be seen at The Museum of Modern Art.

Neutra attended the Sophiengymnasium in Vienna until 1910. He studied under Max Fabiani and Karl Mayreder at the Vienna University of Technology (1910–18), and also attended the private architecture school of Adolf Loos. In 1912 he undertook a study trip to Italy and the Balkans with Ernst Ludwig Freud (son of Sigmund Freud).

In June 1914, Neutra's studies were interrupted when he was ordered to Trebinje, where he served as an lieutenant in the artillery until the end of the war. Dione Neutra recalled her husband Richard's hatred of the retribution against the Serbs in an interview conducted in 1978 after his death: "He talked about the people he met [i.e. in Trebinje] … how his commander was a sadist, who was able to play out his sadistic tendencies … . He was just a small town clerk in Vienna, but then he became his commander."

Neutra took a leave in 1917 to return to the Technische Hochschule to take his final examinations.

After World War I, Neutra went to Switzerland where he worked with the landscape architect Gustav Ammann. In 1921 he served briefly as city architect in the German town of Luckenwalde, and later in the same year he joined the office of Erich Mendelsohn in Berlin. Neutra contributed to the firm's competition entry for a new commercial centre for Haifa, Palestine (1922), and to the Zehlendorf housing project in Berlin (1923). He married Dione Niedermann, the daughter of an architect, in 1922. They had three sons, Frank L (1924–2008), Dion (1926–2019) an architect and his father's partner, and Raymond Richard (1939–) a physician and environmental epidemiologist.

Neutra moved to the United States by 1923 and became a naturalized citizen in 1929. Neutra worked briefly for Frank Lloyd Wright before accepting an invitation from his close friend and university companion Rudolf Schindler to work and live communally in Schindler's Kings Road House in California. Neutra's first work in Los Angeles was in landscape architecture, where he provided the design for the garden of Schindler's beach house (1922–25), designed for Philip Lovell, Newport Beach, and for a pergola and wading pool for Wright and Schindler's complex for Aline Barnsdall on Olive Hill (1925), Hollywood. Schindler and Neutra collaborated on an entry for the League of Nations Competition of 1926–27; in the same year they formed a firm with the planner Carol Aronovici (1881–1957) called the Architectural Group for Industry and Commerce (AGIC). He subsequently developed his own practice and went on to design numerous buildings embodying the International Style, twelve of which are designated as Historic Cultural Monuments (HCM), including the Lovell Health House (HCM #123; 1929) and the Richard and
Dion Neutra VDL Research House (HCM #640; 1966). In California, he became celebrated for rigorously geometric but airy structures that symbolized a West Coast variation on the mid-century modern residence. Clients included Edgar J. Kaufmann, Galka Scheyer, and Walter Conrad Arensberg. In the early 1930s, Neutra's Los Angeles practice trained several young architects who went on to independent success, including Gregory Ain, Harwell Hamilton Harris, and Raphael Soriano. In 1932, he tried to move to the Soviet Union, to help design workers' housing that could be easily constructed, as a means of helping with the housing shortage.

In 1932, Neutra was included in the seminal MoMA exhibition on modern architecture, curated by Philip Johnson and Henry-Russell Hitchcock. From 1943-44 Neutra served as a visiting professor of design at Bennington College in Bennington, Vermont. In 1949 Neutra formed a partnership with Robert E. Alexander that lasted until 1958, which finally gave him the opportunity to design larger commercial and institutional buildings. In 1955, the United States Department of State commissioned Neutra to design a new embassy in Karachi. Neutra's appointment was part of an ambitious program of architectural commissions to renowned architects, which included embassies by Walter Gropius in Athens, Edward Durrell Stone in New Delhi, Marcel Breuer in The Hague, Josep Lluis Sert in Baghdad, and Eero Saarinen in London. In 1965, Neutra formed a partnership with his son Dion Neutra. Between 1960 and 1970, Neutra created eight villas in Europe, four in Switzerland, three in Germany, and one in France. Prominent clients in this period included Gerd Bucerius, publisher of Die Zeit, as well as figures from commerce and science. His work was also part of the architecture event in the art competition at the 1932 Summer Olympics.

Richard Joseph Neutra died on April 16, 1970, at the age of 78.

Architectural style
He was known for the attention he gave to defining the real needs of his clients, regardless of the size of the project, in contrast to other architects eager to impose their artistic vision on a client. Neutra sometimes used detailed questionnaires to discover his client's needs, much to their surprise. His domestic architecture was a blend of art, landscape, and practical comfort.

In a 1947 article for the Los Angeles Times, "The Changing House," Neutra emphasizes the "ready-for-anything" plan – stressing an open, multifunctional plan for living spaces that are flexible, adaptable and easily modified for any type of life or event.

Neutra had a sharp sense of irony. In his autobiography, Life and Shape, he included a playful anecdote about an anonymous movie producer-client who electrified the moat around the house that Neutra designed for him and had his Persian butler fish out the bodies in the morning and dispose of them in a specially designed incinerator. This was a much-embellished account of an actual client, Josef von Sternberg, who indeed had a moated house but not an electrified one.

The novelist/philosopher Ayn Rand was the second owner of the Von Sternberg House in the San Fernando Valley (now destroyed). A photo of Neutra and Rand at the home was taken by Julius Shulman.

Neutra's early watercolors and drawings, most of them of places he traveled (particularly his trips to the Balkans in WWI) and portrait sketches, showed influence from artists such as Gustav Klimt, Egon Schiele etc. Neutra's sister Josefine, who could draw, is cited as developing Neutra's inclination towards drawing.

Legacy 
Neutra's son Dion has kept the Silver Lake offices designed and built by his father open as "Richard and Dion Neutra Architecture" in Los Angeles. The Neutra Office Building is listed on the National Register of Historic Places.

In 1980, Neutra's widow donated the Van der Leeuw House (VDL Research House), then valued at $207,500, to California State Polytechnic University, Pomona (Cal Poly Pomona) to be used by the university's College of Environmental Design faculty and students. In 2011, the Neutra-designed Kronish House (1954) at 9439 Sunset Boulevard in Beverly Hills sold for $12.8 million.

In 2009, the exhibition "Richard Neutra, Architect: Sketches and Drawings" at the Los Angeles Central Library featured a selection of Neutra's travel sketches, figure drawings and building renderings. An exhibition on the architect's work in Europe between 1960 and 1979 was mounted by the MARTa Herford, Germany.

The Kaufmann Desert House was restored by Marmol Radziner + Associates in the mid-1990s.

The typeface family Neutraface, designed by Christian Schwartz for House Industries, was based on Richard Neutra's architecture and design principles.

In 1977, he was posthumously awarded the AIA Gold Medal, and in 2015, he was honored with a Golden Palm Star on the Walk of Stars in Palm Springs, California.

Lost works 

Neutra's 14,000 sqf "Windshield" house built on Fishers Island, NY for John Nicholas Brown II burned down on New Year's Eve 1973 and was not rebuilt.

The 1935 Von Sternberg House in Northridge, California was demolished in 1972.

Neutra's 1960 Fine Arts Building at California State University, Northridge was demolished in 1997, three years after suffering severe damage in the 1994 Northridge earthquake.

The 1962 Maslon House in Rancho Mirage, California, was demolished in 2002.

Neutra's Cyclorama Building at Gettysburg was demolished by the National Park Service in March 2013.

The Slavin House (1956) in Santa Barbara, California was destroyed in a fire in 2001.

Selected works 

 Jardinette Apartments, 1928, 5128 Marathon Street, Hollywood Hills, Los Angeles, California
 Lovell House, 1929, Los Angeles, California
 Van der Leeuw House (VDL Research House), 1932, Los Angeles, California
 Mosk House, 1933, 2742 Hollyridge Drive, Hollywood, California
 Nathan and Malve Koblick House, 1933, 98 Fairview Avenue, Atherton, California
 Universal-International Building (Laemmle Building), 1933, 6300 Hollywood Boulevard, Hollywood, Los Angeles, California
 Scheyer House, 1934, 1880 Blue Heights Drive, Hollywood Hills, Los Angeles, California
 William and Melba Beard House (with Gregory Ain), 1935, 1981 Meadowbrook, Altadena
 California Military Academy, 1935, Culver City, California
 Corona Avenue Elementary School, 1935, 3835 Bell Avenue, Bell, California
 Largent House, 1935, 49 Hopkins Avenue at the corner of Burnett Avenue, San Francisco.
 Von Sternberg House, 1935, San Fernando Valley, Los Angeles
 Sten and Frenke House (Los Angeles Historic-Cultural Monument #647), 1934, 126 Mabery Road, Santa Monica
 The Neutra House Project, 1935, Restoration of the Neutra "Orchard House" in Los Altos, California
 Josef Kun House, 1936, 7960 Fareholm Drive, Nichols Canyon, Hollywood Hills, Los Angeles, California
 Darling House, 1937, 90 Woodland Avenue, San Francisco, California
George Kraigher House, 1937, 525 Paredes Line Road, Brownsville, Texas
 Landfair Apartments, 1937, Westwood, Los Angeles, California
 Strathmore Apartments, 1937, Westwood, Los Angeles, California
 Aquino Duplex, 1937, 2430 Leavenworth Street, San Francisco
 Leon Barsha House (with P. Pfisterer), 1937, 302 Mesa Road, Pacific Palisades, California
 Miller House, 1937, Palm Springs, California
 Windshield House, 1938, Fisher's Island, New York
 Albert Lewin House, 1938, 512-514 Palisades Beach Road, Santa Monica, Los Angeles
 Emerson Junior High School, 1938, 1650 Selby Avenue, West Los Angeles, California
 Ward-Berger House, 1939, 3156 North Lake Hollywood Drive, Hollywood Hills, Los Angeles, California
 Kelton Apartments, Westwood, Los Angeles
Sidney Kahn House, 1940, Telegraph Hill, San Francisco
 Beckstrand House, 1940, 1400 Via Montemar, Palos Verdes Estates, Los Angeles County
 Bonnet House, 1941, 2256 El Contento Drive, Hollywood Hills, Los Angeles, California
 Neutra/Maxwell House, 1941, 475 N. Bowling Green Way, Brentwood, Los Angeles (Moved to Angelino Heights in 2008.)
 Van Cleef Residence, 1942, 651 Warner Avenue, Westwood, Los Angeles
 Geza Rethy House, 1942, 2101 Santa Anita Avenue, Sierra Madre, California
 Channel Heights Housing Projects, 1942, San Pedro, California
 John Nesbitt House, 1942, 414 Avondale, Brentwood, Los Angeles
 Kaufmann Desert House, 1946, Palm Springs, California
 Stuart Bailey House, 1948, Pacific Palisades, California (Case Study 20A)
 Case Study Houses #6, #13, #20A, #21A
 Schmidt House, 1948, 1460 Chamberlain Road, Linda Vista, Pasadena, California
 Joseph Tuta House, 1948, 1800 Via Visalia, Palos Verdes, California
 Holiday House Motel, 1948, 27400 Pacific Coast Highway, Malibu, California
 Elkay Apartments, 1948, 638-642 Kelton Avenue, Westwood, Los Angeles
 Gordon Wilkins House, 1949, 528 South Hermosa Place, South Pasadena, California
 Alpha Wirin House, 1949, 2622 Glendower Avenue, Los Feliz, Los Angeles
 Hines House, 1949, 760 Via Somonte, Palos Verdes, California
 Atwell House, 1950, 1411 Atwell Road, El Cerrito, California
 Nick Helburn House, 1950, Sourdough Road, Bozeman, Montana
 Neutra Office Building — Neutra's design studio from 1950 to 1970
 Kester Avenue Elementary School, 5353 Kester Avenue, Los Angeles (with Dion Neutra), 1951, Sherman Oaks, California
 Everist House, 1951, 200 W. 45th Street, Sioux City, Iowa
Moore House, 1952, Ojai, California (received AIA award)
 Perkins House, 1952–55, 1540 Poppypeak Drive, Pasadena, California
 Schaarman House, 1953, 7850 Torreyson Drive, Hollywood Hills, Los Angeles, California
 Olan G. and Aida T. Hafley House, 1953, 5561 East La Pasada Street, Long Beach
 Brown House, 1955, 10801 Chalon Road, Bel Air, Los Angeles
 Kronish House, 1955, Beverly Hills, California
 Sidney R. Troxell House, 1956, 766 Paseo Miramar, Pacific Palisades, California
 Chuey House, 1956, 2460 Sunset Plaza Drive, Hollywood Hills, Los Angeles, California
 Clark House, 1957, Pasadena, California
 Airman's Memorial Chapel, 1957, 5702 Bauer Road, Miramar, California
 Sorrell's House, 1957, Old State Highway 127, Shoshone, California
 Ferro Chemical Company Building, 1957, Cleveland, Ohio
 The Lew House, 1958, 1456 Sunset Plaza Drive, Los Angeles 
 Connell House, 1958, Pebble Beach, California
 Mellon Hall and Francis Scott Key Auditorium, 1958, St. John's College, Annapolis, Maryland
 Riviera United Methodist Church, 1958, 375 Palos Verdes Boulevard, Redondo Beach
 Loring House, 1959, 2456 Astral Drive, Los Angeles (addition by Escher GuneWardena Architecture, 2006
 Singleton House, 1959, 15000 Mulholland Drive, Hollywood Hills, Los Angeles, California
 Oyler House, 1959 Lone Pine, California
 UCLA Lab School, 1959 (with Robert Alexander)
 Garden Grove Community Church, Community Church, 1959 (Fellowship Hall and Offices), 1961 (Sanctuary), 1968 (Tower of Hope), Garden Grove, California
 Three senior officer's quarters on Mountain Home Air Force Base, Idaho, 1959
 Julian Bond House, 1960, 4449 Yerba Santa, San Diego, California
 R.J. Neutra Elementary School, 1960, Naval Air Station Lemoore, in Lemoore, California (designed in 1929)
 Buena Park Swim Stadium and Recreation Center, 1960, 7225 El Dorado Drive, Buena Park, California
 Palos Verdes High School, 1961, 600 Cloyden Road, Palos Verdes, California
 Haus Rang, 1961, Königstein im Taunus, Germany
 Hans Grelling House/Casa Tuia on Monte Verità, 1961, Strada del Roccolo 11, Ascona, Tessin, Switzerland
 Los Angeles County Hall of Records, 1962, Los Angeles, California.
 Gettysburg Cyclorama, 1962, Gettysburg National Military Park, Pennsylvania
 Gonzales Gorrondona House, 1962, Avenida la Linea 65, Sabana Grande, Caracas, Venezuela
 Bewobau Residences, 1963, Quickborn near Hamburg, Germany
 Mariners Medical Arts, 1963, Newport Beach, California
 Painted Desert Visitor Center, 1963, Petrified Forest National Park, Arizona
 United States Embassy, (later US Consulate General until 2011), 1959, Abdullaha Haroon Road, Karachi, Pakistan
 Swirbul Library, 1963, Adelphi University, Garden City, New York
 Kuhns House, 1964, Woodland Hills, Los Angeles, California
 Rice House (National Register of Historic Places), 1964, 1000 Old Locke Lane, Richmond, Virginia
 VDL II Research House, 1964, (rebuilt with son Dion Neutra) Los Angeles, California
 Rentsch House, 1965, Wengen near Berne in Switzerland; Landscape architect: Ernst Cramer
 Ebelin Bucerius House, 1962–1965, Brione sopra Minusio in Switzerland; Landscape architect: Ernst Cramer
 Roberson Memorial Center, 1965, Binghamton, New York
 Haus Kemper, 1965, Wuppertal, Germany
 Sports and Congress Center, 1965, Reno, Nevada
 Delcourt House, 1968–69, Croix, Nord, France
 Haus Pescher, 1969, Wuppertal, Germany
 Haus Jürgen Tillmanns, 1970, Stettfurt, Thurgau, Switzerland

Publications

 1927: Wie Baut Amerika? (How America Builds) (Julius Hoffman)
 1930: Amerika: Die Stilbildung des neuen Bauens in den Vereinigten Staaten (Anton Schroll Verlag). New Ways of Building in the World [series], vol. 2. Edited by El Lissitzky. 
 1935: 
 1948: Architecture of Social Concern in Regions of Mild Climate (Gerth Todtman)
 1951: Mystery and Realities of the Site (Morgan & Morgan)
 1954: Survival Through Design (Oxford University Press)
 1956: Life and Human Habitat (Alexander Koch Verlag).
 1961: Welt und Wohnung (Alexander Kock Verlag)
 1962: Life and Shape: an Autobiography (Appleton-Century-Crofts), reprinted 2009 (Atara Press)
 1962: Auftrag für morgen (Claassen Verlag)
 1962: World and Dwelling (Universe Books)
 1970: Naturnahes Bauen (Alexander Koch Verlag)
 1971: Building With Nature (Universe Books)
 1974: Wasser Steine Licht (Parey Verlag)
 1977: Bauen und die Sinneswelt (Verlag der Kunst)
 1989: Nature Near: The Late Essays of Richard Neutra (Capra Press)

References

Other sources 
 
 reprinted in 1975 by Praeger
 
 reprinted in 1994 by the University of California Press
 reprinted in 2006 by Rizzoli Publications
 
 
 
 
 
 

Publications on Richard Neutra:

Harriet Roth; Richard Neutra in Berlin, Die Geschichte der Zehlendorfer Häuser, Berlin 2016. Hatje Cantz publishers.

Harriet Roth; Richard Neutra. The Story of the Berlin Houses 1920–1924, Berlin 2019. Hatje Cantz publishers.

Harriet Roth; Richard Neutra. Architekt in Berlin, Berlin 2019. Hentrich&Hentrich publishers.

External links

 Finding Aid for the Richard and Dion Neutra Papers, UCLA Library Special Collections.
 Digitized plans, sketches, photographs, texts from the Richard and Dion Neutra Collection, UCLA Library Special Collections.
  Jan De Graaff Residence architectural drawings and photographs, circa 1940sHeld by the Department of Drawings & Archives, Avery Architectural & Fine Arts Library, Columbia University
 Richard Joseph Neutra papers, 1927-1978 Held in the Dept. of Drawings & Archives, Avery Architectural & Fine Arts Library, Columbia University, New York City
 Neutra Institute for Survival Through Design (NISTD)
 Neutra at GreatBuildings.com
 Neutra at modernsandiego.com
 Neutra biography at r20thcentury.com
 Info and photos from Winkens.ie
 History, plans and photographs of the VDL I & VDL II Research Houses
 Neutra VDL Studio and Residences iPad App
 Richard Neutra and the California Art Club: Pathways to the Josef von Sternberg and Dudley Murphy Commissions
 R. M. Schindler, Richard Neutra and Louis Sullivan's "Kindergarten Chats"
 Foundations of Los Angeles Modernism: Richard Neutra's Mod Squad
 Richard Joseph Neutra papers, 1927-1978, held by the Avery Architectural and Fine Arts Library, Columbia University
Finding aid for Thomas S. Hines interviews regarding Richard J. Neutra. Getty Research Institute, Los Angeles. Accession No. 2010.M.58. Interviewees include Neutra's family, friends, business associates, clients, and Los Angeles architects.

International style architects
Modernist architects from the United States
Jewish architects
American people of Austrian-Jewish descent
1892 births
1970 deaths
01
Austrian architects
Modernist architects
California State Polytechnic University, Pomona faculty
20th-century Austrian people
Austrian Jews
Austrian expatriates in Germany
Austrian emigrants to the United States
Commanders Crosses of the Order of Merit of the Federal Republic of Germany
People from Leopoldstadt
20th-century American architects
Olympic competitors in art competitions
Recipients of the AIA Gold Medal